Finsbury Chapel, originally known as Fletcher's Chapel, was a Congregational chapel on the south side of East Street, Finsbury, London. It was founded by the Church of Scotland minister Alexander Fletcher in 1825.

At its peak it was the largest chapel in London.

References

See also
 John Campbell (19th-century minister)
 Frederick Douglass
 John Morison (pastor)
 Moses Roper

1825 establishments in England
Churches in the London Borough of Islington
Chapels in London
Congregational churches in London